Pnirontis is a genus of assassin bugs in the family Reduviidae. There are more than 30 described species in Pnirontis.

Species
These 37 species belong to the genus Pnirontis:

 Pnirontis acuminata Barber, 1929
 Pnirontis barberi Hussey, 1954
 Pnirontis beieri Wygodzinsky, 1948
 Pnirontis bellatrix Hussey, 1954
 Pnirontis brevispina Barber, 1929
 Pnirontis brimleyi Blatchley, 1926
 Pnirontis buenoi (Lima & Seabra, 1945)
 Pnirontis demerarae Haviland, 1931
 Pnirontis edentula (Berg, 1879)
 Pnirontis elongata Barber, 1929
 Pnirontis filiformis (Walker, 1873)
 Pnirontis grandis Maldonado, 1994-01
 Pnirontis granulosa Barber, 1930
 Pnirontis grisea Barber, 1929
 Pnirontis guggiarii Hussey, 1954
 Pnirontis heminigra Maldonado, 1986
 Pnirontis incerta Reuter, 1887
 Pnirontis infirma Stål, 1859
 Pnirontis inobtrusa Barber, 1929
 Pnirontis languida Stål, 1859
 Pnirontis lissa Maldonado, 1986
 Pnirontis modesta Banks, 1910
 Pnirontis pallescens Stål, 1859
 Pnirontis perpugnax (Torre Bueno, 1914)
 Pnirontis scorpiona Berg
 Pnirontis scorpionia (Berg, 1879)
 Pnirontis scutellaris Stål, 1859
 Pnirontis selecta Barber, 1929
 Pnirontis serripes (Fabricius, 1803)
 Pnirontis sicki Wygodzinsky, 1947
 Pnirontis similis Barber, 1929
 Pnirontis spinimanus Champion, 1898
 Pnirontis spinosissima (Kolenati, 1857)
 Pnirontis stali (Mayr, 1865)
 Pnirontis subinermis Barber, 1929
 Pnirontis uroquadratus Giacchi, 1996-01
 Pnirontis zikani (Lima & Seabra, 1945)

References

Further reading

External links

 

Reduviidae
Articles created by Qbugbot